Ocyusa is a genus of beetles belonging to the family Staphylinidae.

The species of this genus are found in Europe and Northern America.

Species:
 Ocyusa apicalis Normand, 1935 
 Ocyusa argus (Normand, 1935)

References

Staphylinidae
Staphylinidae genera